Honeymoon Travels Pvt. Ltd. is a 2007 Indian comedy drama film. It is produced by Farhan Akhtar and Ritesh Sidhwani under Excel Entertainment banner and marked the debut of Reema Kagti as a director. The movie has six different parts in it.

Plot and characters 
The story is about six couples, who are on their honeymoon with the Honeymoon Travels Pvt. Ltd. bus and their trials and tribulations during the four-day journey to Goa. The couples are:

 Oscar Fernandes and his wife Naheed who have just recently married. They are middle age and the target of constant mocking from everyone else. However, they intend on having a great journey and not be bothered by their difficult pasts. This is their second marriage. Oscar's first wife committed suicide and Naheed's husband and two children died in a car accident. Oscar is Naheed's first husband's business partner. After a chance meeting with Oscar's estranged daughter in Goa, father and daughter mend their relationship.
 Partho Sen and Milly Sen, a couple from a small town in Bengal. He is a serious man and she behaves as a traditional sari-wearing wife. Through an encounter with a bunch of thugs, Partho finds out his timid housewife holds a black belt in martial arts, as she defeats the crooks without breaking a sweat.
 Madhu and Bunty have recently married. Their differences draw from the fact that he is an NRI (non-resident Indian), while she has lived in Mumbai, India, her entire life. Bunty is a closet homosexual and his parents want him to marry the daughter of a family friend. Out of anxiety he surfed the internet for a bride. He met Madhu online, came to India and married quickly. Madhu had a recently failed relationship with a man, whom she left after discovering that he had a wife and child already. She found Bunty and married quickly to forget that pain.
 Pinky and Vicky, hailing from Delhi. They couldn't be more different, as Pinky is very extroverted and Vicky is the opposite. When Vicky meets Bunty for the first time, he develops romantic feelings for him, as he is a closet bisexual but doesn't express them.
 Hitesh and Shilpa are from Gujarat and have recently married. During the first half-hour, Shilpa runs away with her boyfriend, Jignesh. They board the Honeymoon Travels bus returning to Mumbai, while escaping from contract killers sent by Shilpa's father.
 Aspi and Zara are seemingly the most perfect couple of them all: They've never fought. Unknown to each other, each is a superhero and has to go off at a moment's notice to help the people. When Zara questions the whereabouts of her husband when he is not to be found some nights, they fight for the first time. In course of the confrontation, the truth about their superhero identities is revealed to each other.

As the bus continues its journey, it is followed by a mysterious biker, who is revealed early on to be Jignesh Shilpa's boyfriend.

Cast

 Abhay Deol as Aspi
 Minissha Lamba as Zara
 Ranvir Shorey as Hitesh Roshan
 Kay Kay Menon as Partho Sen
 Shabana Azmi as Naheed
 Boman Irani as Oscar Fernandes
 Raima Sen as Milly Sen
 Sandhya Mridul as Madhu
 Vikram Chatwal as Bunty
 Ayaz Khan as Madhu's Boyfriend
Ameesha Patel as Pinky
 Karan Khanna as Vikas 'Vicky' Bihani
 Dia Mirza as Shilpa Vaghani
 Arjun Rampal as Jignesh (Special appearance)
 Suzanne Bernert as Ditta
 Shahana Goswami as Geena (Oscar's daughter)
 Chandan Bisht as Ditta's love interest and Ramprasad's nephew
 Darshan Jariwala as Ramprasad the Bus Driver

Production 
John Abraham and Shilpa Shetty were the first choices to play Jignesh and Shilpa, respectively. After Abraham refused to play the role of Jignesh, Shetty decided she didn't want to play Shilpa and backed out, too.

Reception

Box office
The film collected Rs 11.80 crore and was declared an average grosser in India by Box Office India.

Critical response
Anupama Chopra of India Today gave a positive review saying "Thankfully, Kagti, who also scripted the movie, works with a light hand. There are a few leaden emotional scenes but they are crowded out by the non-stop fun and games. It all heads toward the superb set-piece item: Sajna main vari vari. The cast reads like a who's who of Bollywood's most underrated actors: Ranvir Shorey, Abhay Deol, Kay Kay Menon, Raima Sen. The last two are especially good as the Bengali couple whose equation changes as their honeymoon progresses. Kagti's is a fresh and original voice. This ride is worth taking."
 Jaspreet Pandohar of BBC.com gave the film 3 out of 5 stars stating "Kagti's peppy screenplay and direction may not win awards for originality, but it's a decent effort from a young female filmmaker just starting out. Her likeable characters playing out quirky scenarios hold your attention. However, it's a select number of good individual performances, such as Kay Kay Menon's uptight spouse who lets loose thanks to some magic mushrooms, rather than a collective ensemble effort, that stops Honeymoon Travels Pvt Ltd from being a bigger success."

Conversely, Khalid Mohamed writing for Hindustan Times stated "Despite a jumbo starcast, Honeymoon Travels Pvt Ltd is just about passable." Elvis D'Silva of Rediff.com gave the film 1.5 stars out of 5, writing "As a debutante it must be wonderful for director Reema Kagti to have the backing of major industry players like Farhan Akhtar and Ritesh Sidhwani. Nothing about the film serves as proof of that faith."

Soundtrack 
Music by Vishal-Shekhar.

References

External links
 
 

2007 films
2000s Hindi-language films
2000s drama road movies
Indian drama road movies
Indian comedy-drama films
Films about Indian weddings
Films scored by Vishal–Shekhar
Indian LGBT-related films
Films set in Goa
Films shot in Goa
2007 directorial debut films
2007 drama films
Films directed by Reema Kagti